The Untamed Lady is a 1926 American silent drama film directed by Frank Tuttle, and starring Gloria Swanson and Lawrence Gray. The film was also the debut of Nancy Kelly who was a child actress at the time. The film was written by James Ashmore Creelman from an original story by Fannie Hurst.

Plot
As described in a film magazine review, St. Clair Van Tassel, a wealthy orphan who as a child had her every wish granted, develops into a beautiful but extremely bad tempered young woman who is wooed by many and loved by at least one. She breaks engagements with three men, but meets a different type of man in the fourth. When she attempts to break her engagement with him, he holds her captive in a cabin. She escapes, and, in pursuing her, the man is hurt. She goes to the hospital to see him, and there she becomes aware that her love for him has overcome her blazing temper.

Cast
 Gloria Swanson as St. Clair Van Tassel
 Lawrence Gray as Larry Gastlen
 Joseph W. Smiley as Uncle George
 Charles E. Graham as Shorty
 Nancy Kelly in an undetermined role
 Thomas Holding
 Anita Louise

Preservation
With no prints of The Untamed Lady located in any film archives, it is a lost film.

References

External links

 
 

1926 films
1926 drama films
Silent American drama films
American silent feature films
American black-and-white films
Paramount Pictures films
Famous Players-Lasky films
Films directed by Frank Tuttle
Lost American films
Films based on works by Fannie Hurst
1926 lost films
Lost drama films
1920s English-language films
1920s American films